There are 26 States of Brazil, or Estados in Portuguese, which are the federal states of Brazil, plus the Federal District which holds the capital city, Brasília. The second number in bold corresponds to the map. This and the figures below are based on 2022 estimate data, the life expectancy at birth for women being 81.10 years and for men 74.17, with an average of 77.63 years expected at birth, both sexes combined.

See also
List of South American countries by life expectancy
Brazil
States of Brazil
List of subnational entities
List of Latin American subnational entities by HDI

References

External links
ibge.gov.br

Brazil, life expectancy
LIfe expectancy
Brazil